Antonio Mirante (born 8 July 1983) is an Italian professional footballer who plays as a goalkeeper for  club AC Milan.

Club career

Juventus and loans
After starting his professional career with Juventus, Mirante was loaned to Crotone in 2004, along with Giovanni Bartolucci, Tomas Guzman, Abdoulay Konko, Matteo Paro and Daniele Gastaldello.

In 2005, he was loaned to Siena with Nicola Legrottaglie, Igor Tudor, Paro, Gastaldello, Douglas Ricardo Packer, Cristian Molinaro, Luca Cacciotto and Rej Volpato.

He returned to Juventus in 2006 due to the club's relegation to Serie B following their involvement in the 2006 Calciopoli Scandal; he was capped for the first time when first choice goalkeeper Gianluigi Buffon was red carded in the 24th minute against AlbinoLeffe, on 18 November 2006. Juventus won the 2006–07 Serie B title and obtained promotion to 2007–08 Serie A.

However, he was transferred to the Italian Serie A club Sampdoria on a one-year loan deal for the 2007–08 season on 3 July 2007.

Sampdoria
In the first season with Sampdoria, Mirante was an understudy of Luca Castellazzi. Nevertheless, at the end of the loan in June 2008, the club bought half of the registration rights of Mirante from Juventus for €1.5 million transfer fee.

In the second season Mirante was still served as the understudy of Castellazzi; the co-ownership of Mirante between Juventus and Sampdoria was renewed in June 2009.

Parma
On 19 July 2009, he went on loan to Parma in exchange for defender Marco Rossi, both on temporary deals.

In June 2010, Sampdoria decided not to buy Rossi but sold Mirante to Parma. The Genoa club bought the remaining half of the player registration rights from Juventus for an additional €1.5 million fee and sold the full player registration rights to Parma for €3.6 million, despite also losing another one of its keepers, Castellazzi, to Internazionale on a Bosman transfer, and failing to sign shot-stopper Marco Storari from Milan, who had been on loan at the club.

After arrived in 2009, Mirante was the team's starting keeper until the club formally went bankrupt in June 2015.

Bologna
Mirante was signed by Bologna on a free transfer on 3 July 2015. He was the first choice of the team. On 19 July 2016, Mirante signed a new three-year contract. However, at the start of 2016–17 season he was diagnosed with a heart problem and had to undergo testing which ruled him out indefinitely; on 31 August 2016 the club signed Alfred Gomis on loan from Torino as an emergency replacement. After missing the next two and a half months of the season, he was finally cleared to play in mid November. Mirante made his debut since his injury on 28 November 2016 against Atalanta. He was the captain of Bologna in 2017–18 season, his last season with the club.

Roma
On 22 June 2018, Mirante joined Roma from Bologna for €4 million transfer fee, signing a three-year contract; on the same day both clubs also announced that goalkeeper Łukasz Skorupski had joined Bologna from Roma for €9 million transfer fee, signing a five-year contract. Mirante visited Rome for a medical on 21 June and was presented with his number 83 shirt on the next day.

AC Milan
On 13 October 2021, Mirante signed a contract with AC Milan until 30 June 2022. On 1 July 2022, AC Milan announced the contract extension of Mirante until 30 June 2023.

International career
Mirante was a member of Italy U-21 team in 2006 UEFA European Under-21 Football Championship, as an unused substitute. He has not made his debut for Italy at U-20 or U-21 level, despite having been called up a total of six times; similarly, he has yet to make his senior debut with Italy, despite having received ten call-ups.

On 8 August 2010, he received his first senior international call-up under manager Cesare Prandelli, to replace the injured Federico Marchetti.

Mirante was not included in Prandelli's final 23-man Italy squad for the 2014 FIFA World Cup; however, he was one of the two Italian reserve players alongside Andrea Ranocchia who was kept on the standby list prior to the start of the competition, as a precaution, in case of injury to any of the squad's final players, following an injury scare to back-up goalkeeper Salvatore Sirigu.

Under Antonio Conte, Mirante was called up to the national team for a training camp on 16 May 2016, ahead of the upcoming European Championships; however, later that month, he was not included in the manager's definitive 23-player squad for the final tournament.

In May 2019, he was called up by Roberto Mancini for Italy's European qualifiers against Greece and Bosnia and Herzegovina.

Style of play
Regarded as one of the most promising Italian goalkeepers of his generation in his youth, Mirante is an experienced shot-stopper, who is known for his athleticism, reflexes, positioning, and goalkeeping technique, as well as his ability to save penalties; with 11 stops, he has saved the 13th–highest number of penalties in Serie A history. A tall goalkeeper, with a large frame and a slender build, he also stands out for his aerial game and ability on high balls, while he is less effective at rushing off his line and getting to ground quickly to clear the ball away or deal with low balls and shots; as such, he is not particularly suited to playing as a sweeper-keeper. Due to his calm composure in goal and reserved character, his leadership and ability to organise his defence has also come into question at times in the media. In addition to his goalkeeping ability, he is also comfortable with the ball at his feet.

Career statistics

Club

Honours

Juventus
Serie B: 2006–07

AC Milan
Serie A: 2021–22

References

External links

 AIC profile (data by football.it) 
 FIGC profile 

1983 births
Living people
People from Castellammare di Stabia
Association football goalkeepers
Italian footballers
Italy under-21 international footballers
Juventus F.C. players
F.C. Crotone players
A.C.N. Siena 1904 players
U.C. Sampdoria players
Parma Calcio 1913 players
A.S. Roma players
A.C. Milan players
Serie A players
Serie B players
Footballers from Campania
Sportspeople from the Province of Naples